Juan Pedro Pina Martínez (born 29 June 1985 in Murcia) is a Spanish professional footballer who plays for Orihuela CF as a right back.

Career statistics

References

External links

1985 births
Living people
Spanish footballers
Footballers from Murcia
Association football defenders
La Liga players
Segunda División players
Segunda División B players
Tercera División players
Real Murcia Imperial players
Real Murcia players
CD Alcoyano footballers
UCAM Murcia CF players
Lorca FC players
Recreativo de Huelva players
Orihuela CF players
Cypriot First Division players
Doxa Katokopias FC players
Spanish expatriate footballers
Expatriate footballers in Cyprus
Spanish expatriate sportspeople in Cyprus